The 1905 season was the fourth season of competitive football in Brazil.

Campeonato Paulista

Final Standings

Paulistano declared as the Campeonato Paulista champions.

State championship champions

References

 Brazilian competitions at RSSSF

 
Seasons in Brazilian football
Brazil